Sarv Tomin (also Romanized as Sarv Tomīn) is a village in Saghder Rural District, Jebalbarez District, Jiroft County, Kerman Province, Iran. According to the 2006 census, its population was 70 people from 28 families.

References 

Populated places in Jiroft County